The Catfish Museum and Welcome Center is a museum about the catfish industry in Belzoni, Mississippi.

Location
The museum is located in a former IB&B Depot at 111 Magnolia Street in Belzoni, Humphreys County, Mississippi.

Overview
The museum tells the story of the catfish industry in Humphreys County, Mississippi. Inside, there are exhibitions and a video. Outside, there are sculptures by Mississippi artists.

References

Museums in Humphreys County, Mississippi
Fish and humans